Barri Trotter (born 16 February 1960) is a former Australian rules footballer who played for the Richmond Football Club in the Victorian Football League (VFL)

.

Notes

External links 
		

Living people
1960 births
Australian rules footballers from Victoria (Australia)
Richmond Football Club players